Never Say Goodbye may refer to:

Films
 Never Say Goodbye (1946 film), a romantic comedy directed by James V. Kern, and starring Errol Flynn and Eleanor Parker
 Never Say Goodbye (1956 film), US drama film directed by Jerry Hopper and starring Rock Hudson
 Kabhi Alvida Naa Kehna (Never Say Goodbye), 2006 romance film directed by Karan Johar; starring Shah Rukh Khan and Rani Mukerji

Albums

 Never Say Goodbye (Ten album), live album released in 1998 by British hard rock band Ten
 Never Say Goodbye (Sam Bettens album), 2008
 Never Say Goodbye, 1999 studio album by Roky Erickson

Songs

 "Never Say Goodbye" (Yoko Ono song), 1982
 "Never Say Goodbye" (Bon Jovi song), 1987
 "Never Say Goodbye" (Hardwell and Dyro song), 2013
 "Never Say Goodbye", song from Bob Dylan's 1974 album Planet Waves
 "Never Say Goodbye", B-side to the 1987 single "Strawberry Wine" by My Bloody Valentine
 "Never Say Goodbye", song from Hayley Westenra's 2003 album Pure
 "Never Say Goodbye", end theme to the South Korean television series My Girl (2005)

Other uses

 Never Say Goodbye (musical), musical written by Shûichirô Koike and Frank Wildhorn; first produced in 2006
 Never Say Goodbye (TV series), Philippine television drama that premiered in 2013